Events from the year 1627 in Ireland.

Incumbent
Monarch: Charles I

Events
23 May – the office of Second Serjeant-at-law at the Irish Bar is created, the first holder being Nathaniel Catelyn.
The title Earl of Meath is created in the Peerage of Ireland. Since its creation the title has remained in the Brabazon family.
Muircheartach Óg Ó Cíonga is employed by William Bedell, Provost of Trinity College Dublin, to teach Irish to the Protestants studying there.

Births
 25 January – Robert Boyle, chemist and physicist (d. 1691)

Deaths
 Cormac Mac Con Midhe, poet.

References

 
1620s in Ireland
Ireland
Years of the 17th century in Ireland